Joy Bryant (born October 18, 1974) is an American actress, businesswoman and fashion model. She has appeared in numerous films and television since beginning her acting career in 2001. She has received two NAACP Image Award nominations, and one Screen Actors Guild Award nomination.

Bryant began her career as a fashion model, appearing in advertisements for Ralph Lauren, Tommy Hilfiger, Gap, and Victoria's Secret. She made her film debut in 2001's Carmen: A Hip Hopera. Bryant had her breakthrough after being cast by Denzel Washington in his biographical drama film Antwone Fisher (2002), in which she played a U.S. Navy sailor. This was followed by a recurring guest role on the NBC series ER. Her subsequent film credits include Spider-Man 2 (2004), the horror film The Skeleton Key and the drama Get Rich or Die Tryin' (both 2005), and the historical drama Bobby (2006).

In 2010, Bryant was cast in the role of Jasmine Trussell in the NBC family drama Parenthood, a role she portrayed for the series' entire six seasons before its finale in 2015. She has also appeared on television in guest roles on the series Girls (2017) and Ballers (2018).

Early life
Bryant was born on October 18, 1974 in the Bronx, New York to Joyce Bryant. She was raised by her grandmother, who helped support her on welfare. She started dancing at age three. Bryant would later reveal that she was conceived from a sexual assault against her mother, who was fifteen years old at the time of her birth, by an older adult male. Bryant stated: "[My mother] gave birth to me, not in love but in shame, after hiding her pregnancy from my grandmother for six months."

She described herself as a "nerd" growing up: "I read encyclopedias all day and watched TV. My grandmother, who raised me, emphasized the importance of education. For me it was about being self-sufficient and using my brain." While living in the Bronx, she graduated from CJHS 145x and was a member of the Fieldston Enrichment Program, an elite high school preparatory program. Bryant is a graduate of Westminster School, a boarding school in Simsbury, Connecticut. After graduating from Westminster, Bryant was a gifted student and earned a scholarship to Yale University, where she studied for two years before dropping out to pursue a modeling career. Bryant's grandmother died during her freshman year at Yale, which made her lose interest in studying, saying "I lost my biggest cheerleader, my rock. Being 'smart' didn’t matter to me anymore."

Career

Modeling 
While enrolled as a student at Yale, Bryant was discovered by a modeling scout from Next Model Management and was selected to appear in Seventeen magazine's "Back to School" issue soon after. She began working as a fashion model in Paris. She appeared in advertisements for Gap, Victoria's Secret, Ralph Lauren, Tommy Hilfiger and Rocawear. In 2006, Bryant signed a multi-year contract with CoverGirl. She has walked the runway for Tommy Hilfiger and Givenchy. Bryant hosted BET's 2009 Rip the Runway fashion show with Derek Luke.

She has graced the cover of numerous magazines, including Teen Vogue, Complex, Lonny, Domino and Rolling Out. She has appeared in pictorials for InStyle, Paper, Vanity Fair, Vibe, Playboy, Stuff and Celebrity Skin.

Acting 
Early in her career, Bryant played a small role in Ill Al Skratch's video "I'll Take Her".  Soulchild]] music video for the song "Nothing at All" opposite actor Andre Warmsley in 2004. Her acting debut came in 2001 in Robert Townsend's Carmen: A Hip Hopera, in which she portrayed one of Carmen’s best friends opposite Beyoncé and Mekhi Phifer. After a small role in the action comedy Showtime, she made her big breakthrough in Denzel Washington's directorial debut, Antwone Fisher. In 2003, she co-starred in the Mario Van Peebles biopic Baadasssss!, followed by a recurring guest role on the drama series ER. She portrayed Gina, Jessica Alba's character's best friend in the dance film Honey (2003).

In 2005, she appeared in several high-profile films, including the horror filmThe Skeleton Key and the drama films London and Get Rich or Die Tryin', in the latter of which she played the childhood sweetheart of 50 Cent. In 2007, she had a minor part in the thriller film The Hunting Party starring Richard Gere and Terrence Howard, followed by a leading role in the ensemble comedy Welcome Home Roscoe Jenkins (2008). She also played the role of Tunde Adebimpe's love interest in "Will Do" a 2011 TV on the Radio music video. From 2010 to 2015, Bryant starred as Jasmine Trussell in Parenthood. BuddyTV ranked her #19 on its TV's 100 Sexiest Women of 2011 list. Also in 2015, she had a guest-starring role as Erica Kincaid, a doctor, on the series Rosewood. In 2017, she had a guest-starring role on the HBO series Girls. The following year, Bryant was cast in a recurring role on the sports drama series Ballers, playing a successful public defender and mother of a rising football star. In 2019, she portrayed Lori Foster on Netflix's teen drama web series Trinkets.

Fashion design 
In June 2014, Bryant and her husband Dave Pope launched a clothing line, Basic Terrain, a casual sportswear to performance outerwear line. The collection was inspired by Bryant's love for the outdoors. Basic Terrain's pop-up store was opened in July 2015 at Satine, a clothing boutique in Los Angeles.

Personal life
In October 2007, OK! magazine reported that Bryant was engaged to stuntman Dave Pope, who she met on the set of Welcome Home Roscoe Jenkins. They married on June 28, 2008 in the Hamptons. She owns a ranch house in Glendale, California. She is an ambassador of Oxfam's Sisters on the Planet, an organization that helps women fight hunger, poverty and climate change. As of 2014, Bryant resided with her husband in Glendale.

Filmography

Film

Television

Awards and nominations

Bronx Walk of Fame (2011)

References

External links

 TheLoop21.com interview with Joy Bryant

Actresses from New York City
African-American actresses
American expatriates in France
Female models from New York (state)
American film actresses
American television actresses
Living people
People from the Bronx
Yale University alumni
21st-century American actresses
Westminster School (Connecticut) alumni
21st-century African-American women
21st-century African-American people
20th-century African-American people
20th-century African-American women
Year of birth missing (living people)